Alalakh (Tell Atchana; Hittite: Alalaḫ) is an ancient archaeological site approximately  northeast of Antakya (historic Antioch) in what is now Turkey's Hatay Province. It flourished, as an urban settlement, in the Middle and Late Bronze Age, c. 2000-1200 BC. The city contained palaces, temples, private houses and fortifications. The remains of Alalakh have formed an extensive mound covering around 22 hectares. In Late Bronze Age, Alalakh was the capital of the local kingdom of Mukiš.

The first palace was built around 2000 BC, and likely destroyed in the 12th century BC. The site was thought to have never been reoccupied after that, but archaeologist Timothy Harrison showed, in a (2022) lecture's graphic, it was inhabited also in Amuq Phases N-O, Iron Age, c. 1200-600 BC.

Location 
Lake Amik was an ancient lake in this area.

Human settlements in Amik Valley goes back to the Neolithic period as early as 6,000 BC. Many other ancient archaeological sites are located in this area, such as Tell Tayinat, which was recently excavated. Tell Atchana is located only about 700m southeast of Tell Tayinat within the flood plain of the Orontes River, where the river enters the Amuq Plain.

History

Alalakh was founded by the Amorites (in the territory of present-day Turkey) during the early Middle Bronze Age in the late 3rd millennium BC. The first palace was built c. 2000 BC, contemporary with the Third Dynasty of Ur.

Chronology of Alalakh, related to other sites in the Amuq Lake region, is as follows:

Middle Bronze Age

According to recent excavations led by archaeologists K. A. Yener and Murat Akar, the whole Middle Bronze Age in Alalakh lasted c. 2100-1650 BC, as part of a re-urbanization period in Anatolia as well as in the Near East and Levant. Middle Bronze II began around 19th century BC, in Yener's Period 8 (Woolley's level VIII), in which a palace and a temple, as well as intramural burials, were found. Next, in Period 7 (Level VII), a later palace, an archive, some temples, a city wall, a tripartite gate, households, workshops, extramural and intramural burials were excavated. In the palace of Level VII, during 2015-2019 excavations, more than 70 wall painting fragments were found and radiocarbon-dated to c. 1780-1680 BC.

The written history of the site may begin under the name Alakhtum, with tablets from Mari in the 18th century BC, when the city was part of the kingdom of Yamhad (modern Aleppo). A dossier of tablets records that King Sumu-Epuh sold the territory of Alakhtum to his son-in-law Zimri-Lim, king of Mari, retaining for himself overlordship. After the fall of Mari in 1765 BC, Alalakh seems to have come under the rule of  Yamhad again.

Yarim-Lim dynasty 

King Abba-El I of Aleppo bestowed the city upon his brother Yarim-Lim of Alalakh, to replace the city of Irridu. Abba-El had destroyed the latter after it revolted against Yarim-Lim. In the 18th to 17th centuries period transition, Alalakh was under the reign of Yarim-Lim, and was the capital of the city-state of Mukiš and vassal to Yamhad, centered in modern Aleppo. 

A dynasty of Yarim-Lim's descendants was founded, under the hegemony of Aleppo, that lasted to the second half of 17th century BC. At that time Alalakh was destroyed, possibly by Hittite king Hattusili I, in the second year of his campaigns. As per middle chronology and new publications by archaeologist K. A. Yener, destruction of Alalakh can be firmly located as a "Fire and Conflagration" around 1650 BC.

Late Bronze Age

After a hiatus of less than a century, written records for Alalakh resume.  At this time, it was again the seat of a local dynasty. Most of the information about the founding of this dynasty comes from a statue inscribed with what seems to be  an autobiography of the dynasty's founding king, Idrimi. According to his inscription, in the 15th century BC, Idrimi, son of the king of Yamhad, may have fled his city for Emar, traveled to Alalakh, gained control of the city, and been recognized as a vassal by Barattarna.  The inscription records Idrimi's vicissitudes: after his family had been forced to flee to Emar, he left them and joined the "Hapiru people" in "Ammija in the land of Canaan." The Hapiru recognized him as the "son of their overlord" and "gathered around him";  after living among them for seven years, he led his Habiru warriors in a successful attack by sea on Alalakh, where he became king. The statue mentions an heir, Addu-nirari, who is otherwise not attested.

However, according to the archaeological site report, this statue was discovered in a level of occupation dating several centuries after the time that Idrimi lived. But recently, archaeologist Jacob Lauinger considers the statue and inscription can be dated to Woolley's Level III (/II), c. 1400-1350 BC, around 50 to 100 years after Idrimi's lifetime.   There has been much scholarly debate as to its historicity.  Archaeologically-dated tablets recount that Idrimi's son Niqmepuh was contemporaneous with the Mitanni king Saushtatar. This seems to support the inscription on the statue claiming that Idrimi was contemporaneous with Barattarna, Saushtatar's predecessor.

The socio-economic history of Alalakh during the reign of Idrimi's son and grandson, Niqmepuh and Ilim-ilimma, is well documented by tablets excavated from the site. Idrimi is referred to rarely in these tablets.

In the mid-14th century BC, the Hittite Suppiluliuma I defeated king Tushratta of Mitanni and assumed control of northern Syria, then including Alalakh, which he incorporated into the Hittite Empire. A tablet records his grant of much of Mukish's land (that is, Alalakh's) to Ugarit, after the king of Ugarit alerted the Hittite king to a revolt by the kingdoms of Mukish, Nuhassa, and Niye. The city was largely abandoned by 1300 BC. A small Hittite post was known to be there during the reign of Ammištamru (II) of Ugarit, who ruled c. 1260-1235. The site was reoccupied in Iron Age (c. 1200-600 BC), but the port of Al Mina took its place during this period.

Archaeology

Tell Atchana was excavated by the British archaeologist Sir Leonard Woolley in the years 1937–1939 and 1946–1949. He was assisted by epigrapher Sidney Smith. His team discovered palaces, temples, private houses and fortification walls, in 17 archaeological levels, reaching from late Early Bronze Age (Level XVII, c. 2200–2000 BC) to Late Bronze Age (Level 0, 13th century BC). Among their finds was the inscribed statue of Idrimi, a king of Alalakh c. early 15th century BC. The foreman on the site, working with Woolley, was the Syrian Sheikh Hammoudi ibn Ibrahim.

After several years' surveys beginning in 1995, the University of Chicago team had its first full season of excavation in 2003 directed by K. Aslihan Yener. In 2004, the team had a short excavation and study season in order to process finds. In 2006 the project changed sponsorship and resumed excavations directed by K. Aslihan Yener under the Turkish Ministry of Culture and Tourism and Mustafa Kemal University in Antakya.

About five hundred cuneiform tablets were retrieved at Level VII, (Middle Bronze Age) and Level IV (Late Bronze Age). The inscribed statue of Idrimi, a king of Alalakh c. early 15th century BC, has provided a unique autobiography of Idrimi's youth, his rise to power, and his military and other successes. The statue is now held in the British Museum. Akkadian texts from Alalakh primarily consist of juridical tablets, which record the ruling family's control over land and the income that followed, and administrative documents, which record the flow of commodities in and out of the palace. In addition, there are a few word lists, astrological omens and conjurations.

Many examples of Nuzi ware, a high quality ceramics associated with the Mitanni period, have been discovered in Alalakh. This type of ceramics, as found at Alalakh/Atchana, is sometimes described as Atchana ware, or as Atchana-Nuzi ware.

Goddess Kubaba 
According to Manfred Hutter, the Amik Valley, corresponding to the ancient state of Mukish, and especially Alalakh, was the area where the Syrian and Anatolian goddess Kubaba was originally worshiped. She is generally seen as a benevolent goddess of justice. According to this theory, her worship then spread from Alalakh to Carchemish and Anatolia at large.

Genetics 
According to ancient DNA analyses conducted by Skourtanioti et al. (2020) on 28 human remains from Tell Atchana belonging to the Middle and Late Bronze age period (2006-1303 cal BC), the inhabitants of Alalakh were a mixture of Copper age Levantines and Mesopotamians, and were genetically similar to contemporary Levantines from Ebla and Sidon. Out of twelve males, six carried haplogroup J1a2a1a2-P58, two carried J2a1a1a2b2a-Z1847, and four carried J2b2-Z2454, H2-P96, L2-L595 and T1a1-CTS11451 each. Seven more male individuals were released by Ingman et al. (2021): three males carried J2a1a1a2, while four males carried J1a2a1a, T1a1a, E1b1b-V12 and L1b-M349 each.

See also
Cities of the ancient Near East
Short chronology timeline

Notes

References
VonDassow, E., Von Dassow, E. 1., Owen, D. I. 1., & Wilhelm, G. 1. (2008). State and society in the late Bronze Age: Alalaḫ under the Mittani Empire.Studies on the civilization and culture of Nuzi and the Hurrians.
Lauinger, J. Following the Man of Yamhad, Culture and History of the Ancient Near East, Volume: 75, Brill, 2015  
Lauinger, J. (2008). The Temple of Ištar at Old Babylonian Alalakh, Journal of Ancient Near Eastern Religions, 8(2), 181-217. doi: https://doi.org/10.1163/156921208786611737
Yener KA, Ingman T, editors. Alalakh and its Neighbors: Proceedings of the 15th Anniversary Symposium at the New Hatay Archaeology Museum, June 10–12, 2015. Leiden: Peeters; 2020
Ingman T, Eisenmann S, Skourtanioti E, Akar M, Ilgner J, Gnecchi Ruscone GA, et al. (2021) Human mobility at Tell Atchana (Alalakh), Hatay, Turkey during the 2nd millennium BC: Integration of isotopic and genomic evidence. PLoS ONE 16(6): e0241883. https://doi.org/10.1371/journal.pone.0241883
Donald J. Wiseman, 1953. The Alalakh Tablets, (London: British Institute of Archaeology at Ankara);  reviewed by Joan Lines in American Journal of Archaeology 59.4 (October 1955), pp. 331–332; Reprinted 1983 in series AMS Studies in Anthropology 
Frank Zeeb, "Die Palastwirtschaft in Altsyrien nach den spätaltbabylonischen Getreidelieferlisten aus Alalah (Schicht VII)", Alter Orient und Altes Testament, no. 282.  Münster: Ugarit-Verlag, 2001, 
Marlies Heinz, Tell Atchana, Alalakh. Die Schichten VII-XVII, Neukirchen-Vluyn, 1992.
Nadav Na'aman, "The Ishtar Temple at Alalakh," Journal of Near Eastern Studies, vol. 39, no. 3, pp. 209–214, 1980
Juan Oliva, "New Collations and Remarks on Alalakh VII Tablets," Journal of Near Eastern Studies, vol. 64, no.1, pp. 1–22, 2005
Dominique Collon, The Seal Impressions from Tell Atchana/Alalakh (Alter Orient und Altes Testament), Butzon & Bercker, 1975, 
Amir Sumaka'i Fink, Late Bronze Age Tell Atchana (Alalakh): Stratigraphy, chronology, history, British Archaeological Reports, 2010, 
C. E. Morris and J. H. Crouwel, "Mycenaean Pictorial Pottery from Tell Atchana (Alalakh)," The Annual of the British School at Athens, vol. 80, pp. 85–98, 1985
C. Leonard Woolley, Alalakh: An Account of the Excavations at Tell, Oxford University Press, 1955

External links

official web site of the Alalakh Excavations.
Alalakh Notice and a basic bibliography.
Stone guardian lions of Alalakh
S. Riehl, "Late Bronze Age Tell Atchana" Archaeobotany at Tell Atchana (Tübingen University)

Archaeological sites in Hatay Province
Former populated places in Turkey
Geography of Hatay Province
Tells (archaeology)
Amorites
Yamhad
Hurrians
Mitanni